Noora Matikainen (born 1 September 1980) is a Finnish football goalkeeper. During her playing career, Matikainen has played 300 games in the Kansallinen Liiga. The clubs included HJK, Ilves, FC Honka and FC United.

International career

Matikainen was also part of the Finnish team at the 2005 European Championships. Noora Matikainen was a late replacement in the squad for Satu Peltonen who injured her calf.

Honours

Finnish League: 2002, 2004
Finnish Cup: 2001, 2004, 2006

References

1980 births
Living people
Women's association football goalkeepers
FC Honka (women) players
Helsingin Jalkapalloklubi (women) players
FC United (Jakobstad) players
Finnish women's footballers
Kansallinen Liiga players
Toppserien players
Amazon Grimstad players
Finnish expatriate footballers